Elkhead is an unincorporated community in Douglas County, in the U.S. state of Oregon. Elkhead, which lies along Elk Creek in the Umpqua River basin, is southeast of Yoncalla.

References

Unincorporated communities in Douglas County, Oregon
Unincorporated communities in Oregon